The Council of Ministers of Defense of the CIS is a working body in the Commonwealth of Independent States responsible for military policy of the CIS. It coordinates military cooperation of the CIS member states, and develops military and defense policy of the CIS.

Chairmen 

With the exception of Colonel General Kostyantyn Morozov of the Ministry of Defence of Ukraine, the post of Chairman of the Council of Ministers of the CIS has historically been concurrent with the post of Minister of Defence of the Russian Federation.

 Kostyantyn Morozov (22 December 1991-18 May 1992)
 Pavel Grachev (18 May 1992-17 June 1996)
 Igor Rodionov (17 July 1996-23 May 1997)
 Igor Sergeyev (23 May 1997-28 March 2001)
 Sergei Ivanov (28 March 2001-15 February 2007)
 Anatoliy Serdyukov (15 February 2007-7 May 2012)
 Sergei Shoigu (11 December 2012-Present)

Current members

Subordinates 

 Air Defense Coordination Committee
Joint CIS Air Defense System
Coordinating Committee on Field Training

Sessions

See also 
Commonwealth of Independent States

Notes 

Commonwealth of Independent States